See also Saint Julius (disambiguation)

Saint Julian may refer to:
Julian of Alexandria (died 250), one of the Martyrs of Alexandria under Decius
Julian of Carthage (died 259), one of the Martyrs of Carthage under Valerian
Julian of Antioch (died 305), venerated as a Christian martyr of the fourth century
Julian Sabas (died 377), a hermit who is considered a saint.
Julian of Toledo (642–690), Roman Catholic but born to Jewish parents
Julian the Hospitaller, legendary Roman Catholic saint
Julian of Le Mans (died 3rd century), venerated as first bishop of Le Mans
Julian of Cuenca (1127–1208), bishop of Cuenca, Spain
Julian of Antinoe, see Julian and Basilissa
Julian, brother of Julius of Novara
Julian, companion of Lucian of Beauvais
Quintian, Lucius and Julian (died 430), African martyrs
Julian of Emesa

Saint Julian may also refer to:

Saint Julian (album), by Julian Cope
St. Julian's, a town in Malta
St Julians, Newport, a suburb of the city of Newport, United Kingdom
Sankt Julian, a municipality in Rhineland-Palatinate, Germany

See also 
San Julián (disambiguation)
Julian (disambiguation)
São Julião (disambiguation)
Saint-Julien (disambiguation)
Sant Julià (disambiguation)